City Rats is a feature film set in London, UK released on 24 April 2009 and starring Tamer Hassan, Ray Panthaki, Susan Lynch, Kenny Doughty, MyAnna Buring, James Lance and Natasha Williams and Danny Dyer.

Cast
 Tamer Hassan as Jim
 Ray Panthaki as Dean
 Danny Dyer as Pete
 Susan Lynch as Gina
 Kenny Doughty as Olly
 MyAnna Buring as Sammy
 James Lance as Chris
 Natasha Williams as Carol
 Jake Canuso as Marco Harper
 James Doherty as Trevor
 Philip Herbert as John the Cowboy
 Katrine De Candole as Chloe
 Vyelle Croom as Darryl
 Emily Bowker as Carla
 Mathew Baynton as Barrista

Release
The film premiered as part of the East End Film Festival at the Genesis Cinema Whitechapel on 24 April 2009. The following Monday it was also released on DVD and Blu-ray, reaching number 6 in the UK DVD charts, as well going on to have a limited run in cinemas.

Critical reception 
Critical reaction to City Rats has been universally negative, with the film being one of a select few to  earn a 0% rating at Rotten Tomatoes.

Music
The score for this film was composed by Mark Maclaine and Julia Johnson from London based post-trip hop band Second Person and includes the track "Paper Umbrella". Other tracks were provided by Spencer Hickson.

References

External links

 
 

2009 films
British drama films
2009 drama films
2009 directorial debut films
2000s English-language films
2000s British films